Scanning quantum dot microscopy (SQDM) is a scanning probe microscopy (SPM) that is used to image nanoscale electric potential distributions on surfaces. The method quantifies surface potential variations via their influence on the potential of a quantum dot (QD) attached to the apex of the scanned probe. SQDM allows, for example, the quantification of surface dipoles originating from individual adatoms, molecules, or nanostructures. This gives insights into surface and interface mechanisms such as reconstruction or relaxation, mechanical distortion, charge transfer and chemical interaction. Measuring electric potential distributions is also relevant for characterizing organic and inorganic semiconductor devices which feature electric dipole layers at the relevant interfaces. The probe to surface distance in SQDM ranges from 2 nm to 10 nm and therefore allows imaging on non-planar surfaces or, e.g., of biomolecules with a distinct 3D structure. Related imaging techniques are Kelvin Probe Force Microscopy (KPFM) and Electrostatic Force Microscopy (EFM).

Working principle 

In SQDM, the relation between the potential at the QD and the surface potential (the quantity of interest) is described by a boundary value problem of electrostatics. The boundary  is given by the surfaces of sample and probe assumed to be connected at infinity.

In this expression,  depends on the charge density  inside  and on the potential  on  weighted by the Green's function    

where  satisfies the Laplace equation.

The combination of a conductive probe and a conductive surface, a situation characterized by Dirichlet boundary conditions, has been described in detail.

In the specific case of a conductive boundary, the mutual screening of surface potentials by tip and surface lead to an exponential drop-off of the point spread function. This causes the exceptionally high lateral resolution of SQDM at large tip-surface separations compared to, for example, KPFM.

Practical implementation 
Two methods have been reported to obtain the imaging plane information, i.e., the variations in the QD potential  as the probe is scanned over the surface. In the compensation technique,  is held at a constant value .

In an alternative method, the vertical component of the electric field at the QD position is mapped by measuring the energy shift of a specific optical transition of the QD which occurs due to the Stark effect. This method requires an additional optical setup in addition to the SPM setup.

The object plane image  can be interpreted as a variation of the work function, the surface potential, or the surface dipole density. The equivalence of these quantities is given by the Helmholtz equation. Within the surface dipole density interpretation, surface dipoles of individual nanostructures can be obtained by integration over a sufficiently large surface area.

Topographic information from SQDM 

In the compensation technique, the influence of the global sample potential  on  depends on the shape of the sample surface in a way that is defined by the corresponding boundary value problem. On a non-planar surface, changes in  can therefore not uniquely be assigned to either a change in surface potential or in surface topography  if only a single charge state transition is tracked. For example a protrusion in the surface affects the QD potential since the gating by  works more efficiently if the QD is placed above the protrusion. If two transitions are used in the compensation technique the contributions of surface topography  and potential  can be disentangled and both quantities can be obtained unambiguously. The topographic information obtained via the compensation technique is an effective dielectric topography of metallic nature which is defined by the geometric topography and the dielectric properties of the sample surface or of a nanostructure.

References

External links 
https://www.fz-juelich.de/pgi/pgi-3/EN/Groups/LTSTM/Research/SQDM.html
https://poggiolab.unibas.ch/research/Scanning%20Quantum%20Dot%20Microscopy/
http://momalab.org/index.php/?action=devices

Scanning probe microscopy